The Tennis Napoli Cup (formerly the Capri Watch Cup) is a professional tennis tournament played on outdoor red clay courts. It is currently part of the Association of Tennis Professionals (ATP) Challenger Tour. It is held annually at the Tennis Club Napoli in Naples, Italy, since 1995. The event was given a single-year ATP 250 license in 2022 due to the cancellation of tournaments in China because of the ongoing COVID-19 pandemic.

History
The tournament is the modern iteration of one of the oldest tennis championships in Italy, the Campionato Partenopeo (Parthenopean Championship), which for men's singles was first contested in 1905. Over the years the men's tournament has been combined with other trophies, such as Coppa Gordon Bennet (1907–1910 and 1937), Coppa Reale (1912–1915), Coppa del Municipio di Napoli (1926–1938), Campionato dell’Europa Centrale (1937–1938), Coppa Città di Napoli (1953–1970), Coppa Carlo D'Avalos (1970).

At the time of the amateur tennis the Naples tournament gained increasing importance over the years, becoming one of the pivotal events of the spring season of the courts of Europe and a decisive step in preparation for the Internationals of Italy and those of France. Following the affirmation of professionalism, the tournament lost its relevance and disappeared, rising from the mid-1990s and finding a place within the category of ATP Challenger.

The women's tournament (singles and doubles), played simultaneously with the men's tournament until 1970, now no longer takes place.

Venue
From the beginning, the tournament is played on the courts of the Circolo del Tennis di Napoli, which occupies an area near the ancient Villa Reale di Chiaia, a few meters from the Gulf of Naples and minutes from downtown and historic centre.

Past finals

Singles

Doubles

References

External links
Official website
History of the club by Tennis Club Napoli (part 1)
History of the club by Tennis Club Napoli (part 2)
History of the club by Tennis Club Napoli (part 3)

ATP Challenger Tour
Clay court tennis tournaments
Tennis tournaments in Italy
Tennis Napoli Cup